The Fes World Festival of Sacred Music (Festival des Musiques Sacrées du Monde) is an annual music festival that is held for a week in Fes, Morocco. It was first held in 1994 and usually held over 10 days in early June.

FEZ
The World Festival of Sacred Music-FEZ'' a citywide festival that takes place in Los Angeles once every three years. A sixteen-day celebration of the rich sacred music and movement traditions of the people of Los Angeles, with events produced in diverse venues ranging from the city's major stages to intimate places of worship. The Festival was initiated by the Dalai Lama in 1999 as part of an unprecedented celebration of the human spirit. The Festival is a largely volunteer and grassroots effort based on the intention to utilize the arts festival model to build genuine community cooperation and understanding. Building on the success of the "Americas" festival in 1999 the Los Angeles organizing partners — the UCLA Center for Intercultural Performance, the EarthWays Foundation and the Foundation for World Arts — committed to the creation of a new festival in 2002 and every three years thereafter. In 1999, 2002, 2005, and 2011.

The Aratani World Series is a project of the World Festival of Sacred Music-LA (Foundation of World Arts) in partnership with the Japanese American Cultural and Community Center. The Aratani World Series is a trailblazing new annual series in Los Angeles featuring world-class artists meeting at the global crossroads of music and dance.

Olympia
The World Sacred Music Festival''' in Olympia, Washington, USA began in 2005, inspired by the Fez Festival and other sacred music festivals. Sponsored by the non-profit organization Interfaith Works, the World Sacred Music Festival features regional and international artists from a wide variety of ethnicities and spiritual traditions. In 2005 it was a two-day festival and from 2006 to 2009 it was a single-day festival. In 2010 the festival began presenting quarterly sacred music events.

See also 

 Dar Adiyel

References

External links 
 
 Photos of the 2007 edition, by photojournalist Fabien Maisonneuve
 World Sacred Music Festival of Olympia, Washington, a related site
 World Festival of Sacred Music Los Angeles
  Festival des Musiques Sacrées du Monde on WikiMusique

Religious music
Music festivals in Morocco
Fez, Morocco
World music festivals
Religious music festivals
Music festivals established in 1994